Batrachuperus is a genus of salamander in the family Hynobiidae found in western China and adjacent Myanmar. Their common name is stream salamanders or mountain salamanders. Species now in Paradactylodon were formerly part of the then paraphyletic Batrachuperus.

Species
The genus currently contains six species:
Batrachuperus daochengensis Xiong, Luo & Zeng, 2020
Batrachuperus karlschmidti Liu, 1950 (Chiala mountain salamander)
 Batrachuperus londongensis Liu and Tian, 1978 (Longdong stream salamander)
 Batrachuperus pinchonii David, 1872 (Western Chinese mountain salamander)
 Batrachuperus tibetanus Schmidt, 1925 (Alpine stream salamander)
 Batrachuperus yenyuanensis Liu, 1950 (Yenyuan stream salamander)

References

 
Amphibians of Asia
Amphibian genera
Taxa named by George Albert Boulenger
Taxonomy articles created by Polbot